Clingman Peak is  high, and is the final peak along the south wall at the head of Priestley Glacier, in Victoria Land, Antarctica. The topographical feature was first mapped by the United States Geological Survey from surveys and from U.S. Navy air photos, 1960–64, and named by the Advisory Committee on Antarctic Names for Otis Clingman, Jr., biologist at McMurdo Station, Hut Point Peninsula, Ross Island, 1965–66. The peak lies situated on the Pennell Coast, a portion of Antarctica lying between Cape Williams and Cape Adare.

References
 

Mountains of Victoria Land
Pennell Coast